Lewis White (born 17 April 2000) is a retired Paralympic British swimmer who competed as a S9 classification swimmer, mainly in freestyle events. He holds multiple British records, winning 6 senior international medals in his career. Whilst training at City of Derby, under the tutelage of Mel Marshall, he won 3 international medals. Firstly, 2 Silvers at the Funchal European Championships followed by a Bronze at the Rio 2016 Paralympic Games. This was followed 2 years later, now coached by Amanda Bell, with another 2 Silver Medals at the Dublin European Championships, rounding out the season with another Silver medal, this time at the 2018 Australia Commonwealth Games. All medals came in the 100m or 400m freestyle. Lewis then moved to City of Manchester Aquatics, qualifying for one last European Championships though ultimately retiring before this event.

He remains British record holder in multiple freestyle events (long course and short course) as well as a 20+ time British champion with the first national title won at age 12. He retired in early 2020.

Personal history
White was born in Norwich, England, in April 2000 and grew up in Lowestoft before moving to Derby. He was born without a right hand.

References

External links

2000 births
Living people
English male freestyle swimmers
Paralympic swimmers of Great Britain
S9-classified Paralympic swimmers
Paralympic bronze medalists for Great Britain
Swimmers at the 2016 Summer Paralympics
Medalists at the 2016 Summer Paralympics
Medalists at the World Para Swimming European Championships
Commonwealth Games medallists in swimming
Commonwealth Games silver medallists for England
Swimmers at the 2018 Commonwealth Games
People from Swadlincote
Sportspeople from Derbyshire
Paralympic medalists in swimming
Medallists at the 2018 Commonwealth Games